In a Class of Her Own  is a 2020 Chinese television series starring Ju Jingyi, Song Weilong, Bi Wenjun and Wang Ruichang.  The series premiered on iQiyi with multi-languages subtitles globally on July 23, 2020.

Synopsis 
Xue Wenxi comes from a poor family, and disguises as a guy to make ends meet by helping to transcript and copywrite books.  She meets Feng Chengjun, the son of the Prime Minister, during a business transaction. Coming to admire her talent, Feng Chengjun secretly sets a plan in motion that leaves her with no choice but to enroll in the Yun Shang Academy. As the school only accepts male students, Xue Wenxi disguises herself as a boy (using her brother's name Wenbin), and lives everyday on thin ice to guard her secret. Fortunately, she has Feng Chengjun to come to her aid, allowing her to focus on her studies. Using her wit, kindness and charm, she also become close friends with the rebellious and unrestrained Yu Lexuan and the cold and aloof Lei Zexin. The four become known as the "Yun Shang Quartet". As they overcome many hurdles together, the four influence one another and grow together along the way. Xue Wenxi eventually exposed her identity as a girl, and find mutual love with Feng Chengjun. As they inherit the legacy of their ancestors and strive to uphold their ideals, they also fall into a crisis as they become entangled with the conflicts passed down from the older generation.

Main Cast 
Ju Jingyi as Xue Wenxi
Song Weilong as Feng Chengjun
Bi Wenjun as Yu Lexuan
Wang Ruichang as Lei Zexin. 
Other Cast

Chen Yilong as Han Zhisheng
Zhu Shengyi
Zhang Xin
Wang Jinsong
Yu Bo
Gong Beibi
Wang Ce

References

External links 

 In a Class of Her Own - Weibo Official account
 In a Class of Her Own - iQIYI

Chinese historical television series
2020 web series debuts
Chinese web series
2020 Chinese television series debuts
IQIYI original programming